The 2013 Summer Tour was a co-headlining tour by American bands Matchbox Twenty and the Goo Goo Dolls. Beginning in June 2013, the tour supported the band's albums, North and Magnetic respectively. The tour included more than 30 dates in the United States and Canada.

Background
After the California Mid-State Fair announced their 2013 concert lineup, media outlet began to speculate of the joint tour between the two bands. They were later paired for the Ravinia Festival. Rob Thomas confirmed the outing on March 15, 2013, during an interview on 96.5 TIC FM. Thomas explained many summer tours are a "package deal" and feels it more fun to tour with others. He continued to say, "You are putting together that whole night of music from the minute people sit down. You want to have what is going to feel like a whole night that everybody is going to enjoy […] It's not going to be one band for one group of people, and one band for another".

Opening act
Kate Earl (select dates)

Setlist

Tour dates

Festivals and other miscellaneous performances
These concerts were a part of the "Ravinia Festival"
This concert was a part of the Basilica Block Party
This concert was a part of the "California Mid-State Fair"

Box office score data

Gross

Total available gross: 413,418 tickets sold, $15.5 million from 42 shows

Critical reception
The tour received good feedback from music critics. For the concert in Saratoga Springs, Andrew Champagne (The Saratogian) stated the show was energetic and crowd pleasing. He went on to say, "The three acts combined to play for over three hours and provided plenty of high points on a gorgeous summer evening, The fans in the pavilion and on the lawn were all too happy to oblige". At the Molson Canadian Amphitheatre, Nick Krewen (Toronto Star) gave the show three out of four stars. He writes, "Their musicianship was solid, if not spectacular, songwriter Johnny Rzeznik, relied more on the strength of the songs than their reliance on technology". Katie Foglia (Pittsburgh Post-Gazette) called the show at the First Niagara Pavilion overwhelming. She explained, "After the sun faded, an introductory video hit the screens. The energy was palpable. although marketed as co-headliners, it became clear that the Goo Goo Dolls just started the show—and Matchbox Twenty ended it".

External links
Matchbox Twenty Official Website
Goo Goo Dolls Official Website

References

2013 concert tours
Co-headlining concert tours
Goo Goo Dolls concert tours
Matchbox Twenty concert tours
Concert tours of the United States
Concert tours of Canada